Luis Felipe Castillo (born March 10, 1995) is a Dominican professional baseball pitcher for the Chiba Lotte Marines of Nippon Professional Baseball (NPB). He has played in Major League Baseball (MLB) for the Detroit Tigers. He was signed by the Arizona Diamondbacks as an international free agent in 2012. Before signing professional, he played in Spain in the lower categories of the club Hercules Hospitalet and wes part of the regional team Catalonia of Catalan Baseball and Softball Federation for 4 years.

Career

Arizona Diamondbacks
On February 16, 2012, Castillo signed with the Arizona Diamondbacks as an international free agent. He made his professional debut with the Dominican Summer League Diamondbacks, recording an 0–9 record and 4.48 ERA in 14 starts. He returned to the team the following season and went 4–4 with a 3.58 ERA in 14 starts. For the 2014 season, Castillo played for the rookie-level AZL Diamondbacks, posting a 3–3 record and 4.40 ERA in 15 appearances. The next season, Castillo recorded a 1.83 ERA in 11 games with the team. In 2016, he played for the rookie-level Missoula Osprey, posting an 0–3 record and 4.04 ERA in 19 games. For the 2017 season, Castillo played for the Low-A Hillsboro Hops, registering a 2.91 ERA with 35 strikeouts in 34.0 innings of work. He split the 2018 season between the Single-A Kane County Cougars, Hillsboro, and Missoula, accumulating a 2.41 ERA in 24 appearances between the three teams. In 2019, Castillo played tor the High-A Visalia Rawhide, recording a 9–0 record and 3.81 ERA in 43 appearances.

Castillo did not play in a game in 2020 due to the cancellation of the minor league season because of the COVID-19 pandemic. He was assigned to the Double-A Amarillo Sod Poodles to begin the 2021 season before receiving a promotion to the Triple-A Reno Aces in June. Castillo finished the year with a cumulative 4.72 ERA in 29 appearances between the two affiliates. He elected minor league free agency following the season on November 7, 2021.

Detroit Tigers
On February 1, 2022, Castillo signed a minor league contract with the Detroit Tigers organization. He was assigned to the Triple-A Toledo Mud Hens to begin the season. On August 6, 2022, the Tigers selected Castillo's contract and he made his major league debut that night. He elected free agency on November 10, 2022.

Chiba Lotte Marines
On December 16, 2022, Castillo signed with the Chiba Lotte Marines of Nippon Professional Baseball.

International career
Castillo was named to the Dominican Republic national baseball team for the 2020 Summer Olympics (contested in 2021).

References

External links

1995 births
Living people
Baseball players at the 2020 Summer Olympics
Medalists at the 2020 Summer Olympics
Olympic medalists in baseball
Olympic bronze medalists for the Dominican Republic
Dominican Republic expatriate baseball players in the United States
Major League Baseball pitchers
Detroit Tigers players
Erie SeaWolves players
Toledo Mud Hens players
Dominican Summer League Diamondbacks players
Arizona League Diamondbacks players
Missoula Osprey players
Hillsboro Hops players
Kane County Cougars players
Águilas Cibaeñas players
Visalia Rawhide players
Amarillo Sod Poodles players 
Reno Aces players
Olympic baseball players of the Dominican Republic
People from Sánchez Ramírez Province
Major League Baseball players from the Dominican Republic